Sir Edward Bishopp, 2nd Baronet (1602 – April 1649) was an English politician who sat in the House of Commons in 1626 and in 1640. He supported the Royalist cause in the English Civil War.

Bishopp was the son of Sir Thomas Bishopp, 1st Baronet of Parham Park, Sussex, and his second wife Jane Weston, daughter of Sir Richard Weston of Sutton Surrey. He matriculated at Trinity College, Oxford on 22 October 1619, aged 18 and was a student of the Inner Temple in 1620. He was knighted at Hampton Court on 18 December 1625 and succeeded to the baronetcy on the death of his father in 1626. In 1626, he was elected Member of Parliament for Steyning. 

In 1627 he killed Henry Shirley the playwright when the latter called at his house to collect a £40 annual annuity that Bishopp was obliged to pay him under the terms of a bequest. After initially making his escape Bishopp was captured, charged with manslaughter and sentenced to be burnt on the hand. He was however later pardoned on condition that he paid the annuity to the victim's elder brother, which he never did. He was nevertheless pricked Sheriff of Sussex in 1636.

In April 1640, Bishopp was elected MP for Bramber in the Short Parliament. He was re-elected in the Long Parliament in November 1640 until his election was declared void in December. He supported the King in the civil war and was governor of Arundel Castle on behalf of the King in 1643 and was taken prisoner at the surrender of the castle in January 1644. His estates were sequestrated and he compounded in October 1644. He was fined £7,500 in October 1645 which was later reduced to £4,790. 
 
In about 1626 Bishopp married Mary Tufton, daughter of Nicholas Tufton, 1st Earl of Thanet and Lady Frances Cecil. Lady Frances Cecil was the daughter of Thomas Cecil, 1st Earl of Exeter and Dorothy Neville. Thomas Cecil, 1st Earl of Exeter was the son of William Cecil, Lord Burghley. Subsequent Bishopp baronets carried the name Cecil in recognition of this influential ancestor. Bishopp died at the age of about 47 and was succeeded briefly in the baronetcy by his son Thomas, born 3 Dec 1627. In 1651, Thomas, his mother Mary, and sisters Frances, Diana, Christina, and Mary, successfully appealed for the portion of Sir Edward's estate that was intended for the maintenance of his widow and daughters to be released from sequestration. 
Thomas he died unmarried and without issue in 1652 and was succeeded by his brother Sir Cecil Bishopp, 4th Baronet (c. 1635 – 3 June 1705).

References

1602 births
1649 deaths
Cavaliers
Alumni of Trinity College, Oxford
Members of the Inner Temple
Baronets in the Baronetage of England
English MPs 1626
English MPs 1640 (April)
High Sheriffs of Sussex
People from Parham, West Sussex